JAD or Jad may refer to:

JAD:
JAD Records
Jamaah Ansharut Daulah, an Indonesian terrorist organization
JAD (software), a JAva Decompiler
JAD (file format), Java Application Descriptor
Joint application design (JAD), a process of collection of business requirements to develop a new information system
Jandakot Airport, IATA airport code "JAD"

Jad:
Jád, the Hungarian name for Livezile Commune, Romania
Jad people of India
Jad language

See also 
Jad Abumrad (b. 1973), American radio host and producer
 Yad